Michael Keating (born 10 February 1947 in Edmonton, England) is an English actor. He is best known for his role as Vila Restal in the science fiction television series Blake's 7.

Career
Keating's acting career began in 1966.  One of his earlier notable roles was as Goudry in a 1977 Doctor Who story, entitled The Sun Makers. Just over a month later, Keating first appeared in the role of Vila Restal in the BBC TV series Blake's 7, which aired from 1978 to 1981. Vila Restal was the only character to appear in all fifty-two episodes of the series. In 1981, Keating appeared in an episode of the BBC sitcom Yes Minister titled The Death List, playing the role of Police Constable Ross.

Some years later Michael Keating reunited with his Blake's 7 co-star Gareth Thomas, in an episode of the BBC drama series Casualty. In 2004, Keating returned to the Doctor Who franchise, guest starring as Major Koth in the Big Finish Productions audio adventure The Twilight Kingdom. In 2006, he starred in another Doctor Who audio adventure, this time as Inspector Chardalot in Year of the Pig. In 2009, he had a brief role in the BBC one-off drama Micro Men about the rise of the British home computer market in the late 1970s and early 1980s.

Recent career
From 2005 to 2017, Keating played Reverend Stevens in the BBC soap opera EastEnders. He appears as a recurring character, usually for a single episode or a few episodes at a time, in connection with another character's christening, marriage, or funeral, or relating to regular churchgoer Dot Branning (June Brown).

Filmography

Film

Television

Radio and CD audio dramas

References

External links

Michael Keating from TV.com
Interview with Michael Keating at BBC

1947 births
Living people
English male television actors
English male voice actors
English male soap opera actors
20th-century English male actors
21st-century English male actors
Male actors from London
People from Edmonton, London